Paragon International School (Formerly Zaman International School) is a private bilingual international school in Cambodia's capital Phnom Penh. Paragon ISC is certified by the Cambodian Ministry of Education, is a CIS(Council of International Schools) accredited school, and is accepted by the University of Cambridge International Centre.

History
Paragon International School was founded in 1997 by Mr Atilla Yusuf Guleker and is certified by the Cambodian Ministry of Education. It is CIS (Council of International Schools) Accredited.

From 1997 to 2005 the school was housed in two purpose-converted buildings situated in a central location in street 71 off Mao Tse Tung Boulevard near the junction with Monivong Boulevard.

Paragon ISC High School is located in a distinctively modern building next to the Russian Embassy, in Sangkat Tonle Basak. The Kindergarten and Primary campuses as well as the Paragon University are in the Toul Kork region of city.

Campuses
Paragon International School  is one of Cambodia's independent international schools and has an enrolment of over 1,100 students. The administration and teaching staff represent over nine different countries with the average teacher having over ten years’ experience.

Academics
Paragon International School  is a day school, offering courses designed for students aged four to eighteen years who seek an international education in Phnom Penh.

Facilities at Paragon ISC Secondary Campus include: basketball and volleyball courts; a football field; a library; a dormitory; physics, biology and chemistry laboratories; a computer lab; a theater; classrooms; an art room, music room and a cafeteria all situated on a 7600 m2 campus.

See also
 Zaman University

References

1997 establishments in Cambodia
Educational institutions established in 1997
International schools in Cambodia
Education in Phnom Penh